Joseph O'Reilly was an Irish international soccer player.

O'Reilly was a half back and was capped 20 times for the Republic of Ireland at senior level. He made his debut against the Netherlands in a 2-0 victory in May 1932. O'Reilly opened the scoring in the game, while Paddy Moore scored the second. His final international game was in Bremen in 1939 in a 1-1 draw with Germany only months before the outbreak of World War II.

O'Reilly, together with Paddy Moore and Jimmy Daly, was one of three Irish players who were signed by Aberdeen in the  1930s after their displays with the Irish national team for a combined fee of £1,000.

His brother Peter O'Reilly was a successful Gaelic football player who won an All-Ireland for Dublin in 1942.

Honours

Club
St James Gate
 League of Ireland: 1939–40
 FAI Cup: 1937–38

External links
 Profile from soccerscene.ie
 Profile from backoffice.afc.co.uk

Republic of Ireland association footballers
Republic of Ireland international footballers
Aberdeen F.C. players
St James's Gate F.C. players
Association football midfielders
League of Ireland players
Irish expatriate association footballers
Irish expatriate sportspeople in Scotland
Expatriate footballers in Scotland
Scottish Football League players
Irish Free State international footballers
1911 births
1992 deaths